In mathematics and physical science, spherical harmonics are special functions defined on the surface of a sphere. They are often employed in solving partial differential equations in many scientific fields.

Since the spherical harmonics form a complete set of orthogonal functions and thus an orthonormal basis, each function defined on the surface of a sphere can be written as a sum of these spherical harmonics. This is similar to periodic functions defined on a circle that can be expressed as a sum of circular functions (sines and cosines) via Fourier series. Like the sines and cosines in Fourier series, the spherical harmonics may be organized by (spatial) angular frequency, as seen in the rows of functions in the illustration on the right. Further, spherical harmonics are basis functions for irreducible representations of SO(3), the group of rotations in three dimensions, and thus play a central role in the group theoretic discussion of SO(3).

Spherical harmonics originate from solving Laplace's equation in the spherical domains. Functions that are solutions to Laplace's equation are called harmonics. Despite their name, spherical harmonics take their simplest form in Cartesian coordinates, where they can be defined as homogeneous polynomials of degree  in  that obey Laplace's equation. The connection with spherical coordinates arises immediately if one uses the homogeneity to extract a factor of radial dependence  from the above-mentioned polynomial of degree ; the remaining factor can be regarded as a function of the spherical angular coordinates  and  only, or equivalently of the orientational unit vector  specified by these angles. In this setting, they may be viewed as the angular portion of a set of solutions to Laplace's equation in three dimensions, and this viewpoint is often taken as an alternative definition. Notice, however, that spherical harmonics are not functions on the sphere which are harmonic with respect to the Laplace-Beltrami operator  for the standard round metric on the sphere: the only harmonic functions in this sense on the sphere are the constants, since harmonic functions satisfy the Maximum principle. Spherical harmonics, as functions on the sphere, are eigenfunctions of the Laplace-Beltrami operator (see the section Higher dimensions below).

These functions form an orthogonal system, and are thus basic to the expansion of a general function on the sphere as alluded to above.

Spherical harmonics are important in many theoretical and practical applications, including the representation of multipole electrostatic and electromagnetic fields, electron configurations, gravitational fields, geoids, the magnetic fields of planetary bodies and stars, and the cosmic microwave background radiation. In 3D computer graphics, spherical harmonics play a role in a wide variety of topics including indirect lighting (ambient occlusion, global illumination, precomputed radiance transfer, etc.) and modelling of 3D shapes.

History

Spherical harmonics were first investigated in connection with the Newtonian potential of Newton's law of universal gravitation in three dimensions. In 1782, Pierre-Simon de Laplace had, in his Mécanique Céleste, determined that the gravitational potential  at a point  associated with a set of point masses  located at points  was given by

Each term in the above summation is an individual Newtonian potential for a point mass. He discovered that if  then

The functions  are the Legendre polynomials, and they can be derived as a special case of spherical harmonics. (See Applications of Legendre polynomials in physics for a more detailed analysis.)

In 1867, William Thomson (Lord Kelvin) and Peter Guthrie Tait introduced the solid spherical harmonics in their Treatise on Natural Philosophy, and also first introduced the name of “spherical harmonics” for these functions. The solid harmonics were homogeneous polynomial solutions  of Laplace's equation

By examining Laplace's equation in spherical coordinates, Thomson and Tait recovered Laplace's spherical harmonics. (See the section below, “Harmonic polynomial representation”.) The term “Laplace's coefficients” was employed by William Whewell to describe the particular system of solutions introduced along these lines, whereas others reserved this designation for the zonal spherical harmonics that had properly been introduced by Laplace and Legendre.

The 19th century development of Fourier series made possible the solution of a wide variety of physical problems in rectangular domains, such as the solution of the heat equation and wave equation. This could be achieved by expansion of functions in series of trigonometric functions. Whereas the trigonometric functions in a Fourier series represent the fundamental modes of vibration in a string, the spherical harmonics represent the fundamental modes of vibration of a sphere in much the same way. Many aspects of the theory of Fourier series could be generalized by taking expansions in spherical harmonics rather than trigonometric functions. Moreover, analogous to how trigonometric functions can equivalently be written as complex exponentials, spherical harmonics also possessed an equivalent form as complex-valued functions. This was a boon for problems possessing spherical symmetry, such as those of celestial mechanics originally studied by Laplace and Legendre.

The prevalence of spherical harmonics already in physics set the stage for their later importance in the 20th century birth of quantum mechanics. The (complex-valued) spherical harmonics  are eigenfunctions of the square of the orbital angular momentum operator

and therefore they represent the different quantized configurations of atomic orbitals.

Laplace's spherical harmonics

Laplace's equation imposes that the Laplacian of a scalar field  is zero. (Here the scalar field is understood to be complex, i.e. to correspond to a (smooth) function .) In spherical coordinates this is:

Consider the problem of finding solutions of the form . By separation of variables, two differential equations result by imposing Laplace's equation:

The second equation can be simplified under the assumption that  has the form . Applying separation of variables again to the second equation gives way to the pair of differential equations

for some number . The solution function  is regular at the poles of the sphere, where . Furthermore, a change of variables  transforms this equation into the Legendre equation, whose solution is a multiple of the associated Legendre polynomial  . Finally, the equation for  has solutions of the form ; requiring the solution to be regular throughout  forces .

Here the solution was assumed to have the special form . These angular solutions  are a product of trigonometric functions, here represented as a complex exponential, and associated Legendre polynomials:

which fulfill

In fact, for any such solution,  is the expression in spherical coordinates of a homogeneous polynomial  that is harmonic (see below), and so counting dimensions shows that there are  linearly independent such polynomials.

The general solution  to Laplace's equation  in a ball centered at the origin is a linear combination of the spherical harmonic functions multiplied by the appropriate scale factor ,

Such an expansion is valid in the ball

In that case, one needs to expand the solution of known regions in Laurent series (about ), instead of the Taylor series (about ) used above, to match the terms and find series expansion coefficients .

Orbital angular momentum
In quantum mechanics, Laplace's spherical harmonics are understood in terms of the orbital angular momentum

The spherical harmonics are eigenfunctions of the square of the orbital angular momentum

Laplace's spherical harmonics are the joint eigenfunctions of the square of the orbital angular momentum and the generator of rotations about the azimuthal axis:

These operators commute, and are densely defined self-adjoint operators on the weighted Hilbert space of functions f square-integrable with respect to the normal distribution as the weight function on R3:

Furthermore, L2 is a positive operator.

for some real numbers m and λ. Here m must in fact be an integer, for Y must be periodic in the coordinate φ with period a number that evenly divides 2π. Furthermore, since

and each of Lx, Ly, Lz are self-adjoint, it follows that .

In particular,  must be zero for k sufficiently large, because the inequality  must hold in each of the nontrivial joint eigenspaces. Let  be a nonzero joint eigenfunction, and let  be the least integer such that

Then, since

it follows that

Thus  for the positive integer .

The foregoing has been all worked out in the spherical coordinate representation,  but may be expressed more abstractly in the complete, orthonormal spherical ket basis.

Harmonic polynomial representation

The spherical harmonics can be expressed as the restriction to the unit sphere of certain polynomial functions . Specifically, we say that a (complex-valued) polynomial function  is homogeneous of degree  if

for all real numbers  and all . We say that  is harmonic if

where  is the Laplacian. Then for each , we define

For example, when ,  is just the 3-dimensional space of all linear functions , since any such function is automatically harmonic. Meanwhile, when , we have a 5-dimensional space:

As suggested in the introduction, this perspective is presumably the origin of the term “spherical harmonic” (i.e., the restriction to the sphere of a harmonic function).

For example, for any  the formula

This polynomial is easily seen to be harmonic.

which can be rewritten as

After using the formula for the associated Legendre polynomial , we may recognize this as the formula for the spherical harmonic  (See the section below on special cases of the spherical harmonics.)

Conventions

Orthogonality and normalization

Several different normalizations are in common use for the Laplace spherical harmonic functions .

which is the natural normalization given by Rodrigues' formula.

In acoustics, the Laplace spherical harmonics are generally defined as (this is the convention used in this article)

while in quantum mechanics:

where  are associated Legendre polynomials without the Condon–Shortley phase (to avoid counting the phase twice).

In both definitions, the spherical harmonics are orthonormal

This normalization is used in quantum mechanics because it ensures that probability is normalized, i.e.,

The disciplines of geodesy and spectral analysis use

which possess unit power

The magnetics community, in contrast, uses Schmidt semi-normalized harmonics

which have the normalization

In quantum mechanics this normalization is sometimes used as well, and is named Racah's normalization after Giulio Racah.

It can be shown that all of the above normalized spherical harmonic functions satisfy

where the superscript  denotes complex conjugation. Alternatively, this equation follows from the relation of the spherical harmonic functions with the Wigner D-matrix.

Condon–Shortley phase
In the quantum mechanics community, it is common practice to either include this phase factor in the definition of the associated Legendre polynomials, or to append it to the definition of the spherical harmonic functions. There is no requirement to use the Condon–Shortley phase in the definition of the spherical harmonic functions, but including it can simplify some quantum mechanical operations, especially the application of raising and lowering operators. The geodesy and magnetics communities never include the Condon–Shortley phase factor in their definitions of the spherical harmonic functions nor in the ones of the associated Legendre polynomials.

Real form
A real basis of spherical harmonics  can be defined in terms of their complex analogues  by setting

The Condon–Shortley phase convention is used here for consistency. The corresponding inverse equations defining the complex spherical harmonics  in terms of the real spherical harmonics  are

The real spherical harmonics  are sometimes known as tesseral spherical harmonics. The reason for this can be seen by writing the functions in terms of the Legendre polynomials as

The same sine and cosine factors can be also seen in the following subsection that deals with the Cartesian representation.

See here for a list of real spherical harmonics up to and including , which can be seen to be consistent with the output of the equations above.

Use in quantum chemistry 

As is known from the analytic solutions for the hydrogen atom, the eigenfunctions of the angular part of the wave function are spherical harmonics. However, the solutions of the non-relativistic Schrödinger equation without magnetic terms can be made real. This is why the real forms are extensively used in basis functions for quantum chemistry, as the programs don't then need to use complex algebra. Here, it is important to note that the real functions span the same space as the complex ones would.

Spherical harmonics in Cartesian form 

It turns out that  is basis of the space of harmonic and homogeneous polynomials of degree .

The Herglotz generating function

     is a vector with complex coordinates:

In naming this generating function after Herglotz, we follow , who credit unpublished notes by him for its discovery.

Essentially all the properties of the spherical harmonics can be derived from this generating function. An immediate benefit of this definition is that if the vector  is replaced by the quantum mechanical spin vector operator , such that  is the operator analogue of the solid harmonic , one obtains a generating function for a standardized set of spherical tensor operators, :

They are, moreover, a standardized set with a fixed scale or normalization.

Separated Cartesian form

and for :

Here

and

For  this reduces to

The factor  is essentially the associated Legendre polynomial , and the factors  are essentially .

Examples

It may be verified that this agrees with the function listed here and here.

Real forms

Using the equations above to form the real spherical harmonics, it is seen that for  only the  terms (cosines) are included, and for  only the  terms (sines) are included:

and for m = 0:

Special cases and values
 When , the spherical harmonics  reduce to the ordinary Legendre polynomials: 
 When ,  or more simply in Cartesian coordinates, 

Symmetry properties
The spherical harmonics have deep and consequential properties under the operations of spatial inversion (parity) and rotation.

Parity 

The spherical harmonics have definite parity. That is, they are either even or odd with respect to inversion about the origin. Inversion is represented by the operator . Then, as can be seen in many ways (perhaps most simply from the Herglotz generating function), with  being a unit vector,

The statement of the parity of spherical harmonics is then

Rotations

Under this operation, a spherical harmonic of degree  and order  transforms into a linear combination of spherical harmonics of the same degree. That is,

where  is a matrix of order  that depends on the rotation . However, this is not the standard way of expressing this property. In the standard way one writes,

where  is the complex conjugate of an element of the Wigner D-matrix. In particular when  is a  rotation of the azimuth we get the identity,

The rotational behavior of the spherical harmonics is perhaps their quintessential feature from the viewpoint of group theory. The 's of degree  provide a basis set of functions for the irreducible representation of the group SO(3) of dimension . Many facts about spherical harmonics (such as the addition theorem) that are proved laboriously using the methods of analysis acquire simpler proofs and deeper significance using the methods of symmetry.

Spherical harmonics expansion
The Laplace spherical harmonics  form a complete set of orthonormal functions and thus form an orthonormal basis of the Hilbert space of square-integrable functions . On the unit sphere , any square-integrable function  can thus be expanded as a linear combination of these:

This expansion holds in the sense of mean-square convergence — convergence in L2 of the sphere — which is to say that

The expansion coefficients are the analogs of Fourier coefficients, and can be obtained by multiplying the above equation by the complex conjugate of a spherical harmonic, integrating over the solid angle Ω, and utilizing the above orthogonality relationships. This is justified rigorously by basic Hilbert space theory. For the case of orthonormalized harmonics, this gives:

If the coefficients decay in ℓ sufficiently rapidly — for instance, exponentially — then the series also converges uniformly to f.

The convergence of the series holds again in the same sense, namely the real spherical harmonics  form a complete set of orthonormal functions and thus form an orthonormal basis of the Hilbert space of square-integrable functions .

Spectrum analysis

Power spectrum in signal processing
The total power of a function f is defined in the signal processing literature as the integral of the function squared, divided by the area of its domain. Using the orthonormality properties of the real unit-power spherical harmonic functions, it is straightforward to verify that the total power of a function defined on the unit sphere is related to its spectral coefficients by a generalization of Parseval's theorem (here, the theorem is stated for Schmidt semi-normalized harmonics, the relationship is slightly different for orthonormal harmonics):

where

is defined as the angular power spectrum (for Schmidt semi-normalized harmonics). In a similar manner, one can define the cross-power of two functions as

where

is defined as the cross-power spectrum. It is common that the (cross-)power spectrum is well approximated by a power law of the form

When , the spectrum is "white" as each degree possesses equal power. When , the spectrum is termed "red" as there is more power at the low degrees with long wavelengths than higher degrees. Finally, when , the spectrum is termed "blue".

Differentiability properties
If, furthermore,  decays exponentially, then  is actually real analytic on the sphere.

The general technique is to use the theory of Sobolev spaces. Specifically, if

then  is in the Sobolev space . In particular, the Sobolev embedding theorem implies that  is infinitely differentiable provided that

for all .

Algebraic properties

Addition theorem 
A mathematical result of considerable interest and use is called the addition theorem for spherical harmonics.

in which the role of the trigonometric functions appearing on the right-hand side is played by the spherical harmonics and that of the left-hand side is played by the Legendre polynomials.

The addition theorem states

where  is the Legendre polynomial of degree . This expression is valid for both real and complex harmonics. The result can be proven analytically, using the properties of the Poisson kernel in the unit ball, or geometrically by applying a rotation to the vector y so that it points along the z-axis, and then directly calculating the right-hand side.

In particular, when , this gives Unsöld's theorem

which generalizes the identity  to two dimensions.

In the expansion, the left-hand side  is a constant multiple of the degree  zonal spherical harmonic. From this perspective, one has the following generalization to higher dimensions. Let  be an arbitrary orthonormal basis of the space  of degree  spherical harmonics on the -sphere. Then , the degree  zonal harmonic corresponding to the unit vector , decomposes as

Furthermore, the zonal harmonic  is given as a constant multiple of the appropriate Gegenbauer polynomial:

Finally, evaluating at  gives the functional identity

where  is the volume of the (n−1)-sphere.

Contraction rule 
Another useful identity expresses the product of two spherical harmonics as a sum over spherical harmonics

Many of the terms in this sum are trivially zero.

Clebsch–Gordan coefficients 

The Clebsch–Gordan coefficients are the coefficients appearing in the expansion of the product of two spherical harmonics in terms of spherical harmonics themselves. A variety of techniques are available for doing essentially the same calculation, including the Wigner 3-jm symbol, the Racah coefficients, and the Slater integrals. Abstractly, the Clebsch–Gordan coefficients express the tensor product of two irreducible representations of the rotation group as a sum of irreducible representations: suitably normalized, the coefficients are then the multiplicities.

Visualization of the spherical harmonics

The Laplace spherical harmonics  can be visualized by considering their "nodal lines", that is, the set of points on the sphere where , or alternatively where .

When the spherical harmonic order m is zero (upper-left in the figure), the spherical harmonic functions do not depend upon longitude, and are referred to as zonal. Such spherical harmonics are a special case of zonal spherical functions. When  (bottom-right in the figure), there are no zero crossings in latitude, and the functions are referred to as sectoral. For the other cases, the functions checker the sphere, and they are referred to as tesseral.

More general spherical harmonics of degree  are not necessarily those of the Laplace basis , and their nodal sets can be of a fairly general kind.

List of spherical harmonics

Analytic expressions for the first few orthonormalized Laplace spherical harmonics  that use the Condon–Shortley phase convention:

Higher dimensions
The classical spherical harmonics are defined as complex-valued functions on the unit sphere  inside three-dimensional Euclidean space . Spherical harmonics can be generalized to higher-dimensional Euclidean space  as follows, leading to functions . Let Pℓ denote the space of complex-valued homogeneous polynomials of degree  in  real variables, here considered as functions . That is, a polynomial  is in  provided that for any real , one has

Let Aℓ denote the subspace of Pℓ consisting of all harmonic polynomials:

These are the (regular) solid spherical harmonics. Let Hℓ denote the space of functions on the unit sphere

obtained by restriction from 

The following properties hold:
As a result, the sum of these spaces is also dense in the space  of square-integrable functions on the sphere. Thus every square-integrable function on the sphere decomposes uniquely into a series of spherical harmonics, where the series converges in the  sense.
This operator is the analog of the angular part of the Laplacian in three dimensions; to wit, the Laplacian in  dimensions decomposes as 
 Every homogeneous polynomial  can be uniquely written in the form  where . In particular, 

An orthogonal basis of spherical harmonics in higher dimensions can be constructed inductively by the method of separation of variables, by solving the Sturm-Liouville problem for the spherical Laplacian

where φ is the axial coordinate in a spherical coordinate system on Sn−1. The end result of such a procedure is

The functions in the product are defined in terms of the Legendre function

Connection with representation theory
The space  of spherical harmonics of degree  is a representation of the symmetry group of rotations around a point (SO(3)) and its double-cover SU(2).

for  a spherical harmonic and  a rotation. The representation  is an irreducible representation of SO(3).

The elements of  arise as the restrictions to the sphere of elements of : harmonic polynomials homogeneous of degree  on three-dimensional Euclidean space .

The condition that  be harmonic is equivalent to the assertion that the tensor  must be trace free on every pair of indices.

More generally, the analogous statements hold in higher dimensions: the space  of spherical harmonics on the -sphere is the irreducible representation of  corresponding to the traceless symmetric -tensors.

The special orthogonal groups have additional spin representations that are not tensor representations, and are typically not spherical harmonics. An exception are the spin representation of SO(3): strictly speaking these are representations of the double cover SU(2) of SO(3). In turn, SU(2) is identified with the group of unit quaternions, and so coincides with the 3-sphere. The spaces of spherical harmonics on the 3-sphere are certain spin representations of SO(3), with respect to the action by quaternionic multiplication.

Connection with hemispherical harmonics
Spherical harmonics can be separated into two set of functions. One is hemispherical functions (HSH), orthogonal and complete on hemisphere. Another is complementary hemispherical harmonics (CHSH).

Generalizations
The angle-preserving symmetries of the two-sphere are described by the group of Möbius transformations PSL(2,C). With respect to this group, the sphere is equivalent to the usual Riemann sphere. The group PSL(2,C) is isomorphic to the (proper) Lorentz group, and its action on the two-sphere agrees with the action of the Lorentz group on the celestial sphere in Minkowski space.

More generally, hypergeometric series can be generalized to describe the symmetries of any symmetric space; in particular, hypergeometric series can be developed for any Lie group.

See also

 Cubic harmonic (often used instead of spherical harmonics in computations)
 Cylindrical harmonics
 Spherical basis
 Spinor spherical harmonics
 Spin-weighted spherical harmonics
 Sturm–Liouville theory
 Table of spherical harmonics
 Vector spherical harmonics
 Atomic orbital

Notes

References

Cited references 
 .
 
 
 
 .
 .
 .
 .
 .
 .

General references 
 E.W. Hobson, The Theory of Spherical and Ellipsoidal Harmonics, (1955) Chelsea Pub. Co., .
 C. Müller, Spherical Harmonics, (1966) Springer, Lecture Notes in Mathematics, Vol. 17, .
 E. U. Condon and G. H. Shortley, The Theory of Atomic Spectra, (1970) Cambridge at the University Press, See chapter 3.
 J.D. Jackson, Classical Electrodynamics, 
 Albert Messiah, Quantum Mechanics, volume II. (2000) Dover. .
 
 D. A. Varshalovich, A. N. Moskalev, V. K. Khersonskii Quantum Theory of Angular Momentum,(1988) World Scientific Publishing Co., Singapore, 
 
 

Atomic physics
Fourier analysis
Harmonic analysis
Partial differential equations
Rotational symmetry
Special hypergeometric functions

External links
 Spherical Harmonics at MathWorld
 Spherical Harmonics 3D representation